Dilip Purushottam Chitre (17 September 1938 – 10 December 2009) was one of the foremost Indian poets and critics to emerge in the post Independence India. Apart from being a notable bilingual writer, writing in Marathi and English, he was also a teacher, a painter, a filmmaker and a magazine columnist.

Biography

Chitre was born in Baroda on 17 September 1938 into a Marathi speaking CKP community. His father Purushottam Chitre used to publish a periodical named Abhiruchi. His grandfather, Kashinath Gupte was an expert on Tukaram and this served as Chitre's introduction to the poet. Chitre's family moved to Mumbai in 1951 and he published his first collection of poems in 1960. He was one of the earliest and the most important influences behind the famous "little magazine movement" of the sixties in Marathi. He started Shabda with Arun Kolatkar and Ramesh Samarth. In 1975, he was awarded a visiting fellowship by the International Writing Programme of the University of Iowa in Iowa City, Iowa in the United States. He has also worked as a director of the Indian Poetry Library, archive, and translation centre at Bharat Bhavan, a multi arts foundation. He also convened a world poetry festival in New Delhi followed by an international symposium of poets in Bhopal. He was educated both in Baroda and Mumbai.

After a long bout with cancer, Dilip Chitre died at his residence in Pune on 10 December 2009.

Works

Poetry

Chitre was a bilingual writer, but wrote mostly in Marathi. His Ekun Kavita or Collected Poems were published in the 1990s in three volumes.  As Is, Where Is selected English poems (1964–2007) and "Shesha" English translation of selected Marathi poems, both published by Poetrywala, were published in 2007. He also edited An Anthology of Marathi Poetry (1945–1965). He was an accomplished translator of prose and poetry. His most famous translation was of the celebrated 17th century Marathi bhakti poet Tukaram (published as Says Tuka). He translated Anubhavamrut by twelfth century bhakti poet Dnyaneshwar. He also wrote poetry in English. Travelling in a Cage (1980) was his first and only book of English poems.

Exile, alienation, self-disintegration and death are major themes in Chitre's poetry, which belongs essentially to the Modernist Movement. It reflects cosmopolitan culture, urban sensibilities, uses oblique expressions and ironic tones.

Films

He started his professional film career in 1969 and made one feature film, about a dozen documentary films, several short films and about 20 video documentary features. He wrote the scripts of most of his films as well as directed or co-directed them. He also scored the music for some of them.

Awards and honors

Among Chitre's honours and awards are several Maharashtra State Awards, the Prix Special du Jury for his film Godam at the Festival des Trois Continents in 1984, the Ministry of Human Resource Development's Emeritua Fellowship, the University of Iowa's International Writing Program Fellowship, the Indira Gandhi Fellowship, and the Villa Waldberta Fellowship for residence given by the City of Munich, Bavaria, Germany. He was a D.A.A.D. (German Academic Exchange) Fellow and Writer-in-Residence at the Universities of Heidelberg and Bamberg in Germany in 1991–92. He was Director of Vagarth, Bharat Bhavan Bhopal and convenor-director of the Valmiki World Poetry Festival (New Delhi,1985) and International Symposium of Poets (Bhopal, 1985), a Keynote Speaker at the World Poetry Congress in Maebashi, Japan (1996) and at the Ninth International Conference on Maharashtra at Saint Paul, Minnesota, USA in 2001 and Member of the International Jury at the Literature festival Berlin, 2001.

He was member of a three-writer delegation (along with Nirmal Verma and U. R. Ananthamurthy) to the Soviet Union (Russia, Ukraine, and Georgia), Hungary, the Federal Republic of Germany and France in the spring and summer of 1980 and to the Frankfurter Buchmesse in Frankfurt, Germany in 1986.
 
He was Honorary President of the Sontheimer Cultural Association, of which he was also a Founder-Trustee.

Bibliography

In Marathi
Kavita, Mouj Prakashan, Mumbai, 1960
Orpheus, Mouj Prakashan, Mumbai,1968; 2nd Ed: Shabdalay Prakashan, Srirampur,2010
Sheeba Raneechya Shodhaat, Majestic Prakashan, Mumbai,1969
Kavitenantarchyaa Kavita, Vacha Prakashan, Aurangabad,1978
Chaavyaa; Pras Prakashan, Mumbai, 1983
Dahaa By Dahaa, Pras Prakashan, Mumbai, 1983
Mithu Mithu Porat ani Sutak, Saket Prakashan, Aurangabad,1989
Tirkas Ani Chaukas, Lok Vangmay Griha, Mumbai;1980;2nd Ed: Shabdalay Prakashan, Srirampur,2010
Punha Tukaram, S.K.Belvalkar, Pune, 1990; 2nd edition: Popular Prakashan, Mumbai, 1995; 3rd edition:Popular Prakashan, Mumbai, 2001
Shatakaanchaa Sandhikaal, Lok Vangmay Griha, Mumbai
Bhau Padhye Yanchyaa Shreshtha Kathaa ( Editor), Lok Vangmay Griha, Mumbai, 1995
Ekoon Kavita-1, Popular Prakashan, Mumbai, 1992; 2nd edition:1995
Ekoon Kavita-2, Popular Prakashan; Mumbai;1995
Ekoon Kavita-3, Popular Prakashan; Mumbai
Chaturang, Popular Prakashan, Mumbai;1995
Tukobache Vaikunthagaman, Shabdalay Prakashan, Srirampur,2010
Agatikanche Jaagatikikaran, Shabdalay Prakashan, Srirampur,2010
 Kavi Kai Kaam Karto(in Gujarati and English translation),  Poetrywala, Mumbai,2010

In English
An Anthology of Marathi Poetry (1945–1965) (Editor), Nirmala-Sadanand, Mumbai, 1968
Ambulance Ride, Self, Mumbai, 1972
Travelling in a Cage; Clearing House; Mumbai; 1980
The Reasoning Vision: Jehangir Sabavala’s Painterly Universe, Introduction and Notes on the paintings by Dilip Chitre
Tata-McGraw-Hill, New Delhi, 1980
Says Tuka: Translation of Tukaram, Penguin, 1991
Tender Ironies: A Tribute To Lothar Lutze (Editor), Manohar, New Delhi, 1994
Shri Jnandev’s Anubhavamrut: The Immortal Experience of Being, Sahitya Akademi, New Delhi, 1996
The Mountain, Vijaya Chitre, Pune, 1998
No-Moon Monday On The River Karha, Vijaya Chitre, Pune, 2000
 Virus Alert: Poems of Hemant Divate,( as translator) Mumbai: Poetrywala, 2003
 Namdeo Dhasal: Poet of the Underground: Poems 1972–2006 (as Translator), Navayana Publishing, Chennai, 2007
 As Is, Where Is: Selected Poems, Poetrywala, Mumbai,2008 Shesha: Selected Marathi poems in English Translation, Poetrywala, Mumbai, 2008Felling of the Banyan TreeFather Returning Home

In HindiPisati ka Burz: Dileep Chitre ki Chuni Huvi Kavitaayen, translated by Chandrakant Deotale, Rajkamal, New Delhi, 1987

In GujaratiMilton-na Mahaakaavyo, translated by Yashwant Dashi and the author,  Parichay Pustakavali, Mumbai, 1970
Kavya Vishva Shreni: Marathi: Dileep Chitre, translated by Jaya Mehta, Gujarat Sahitya Academy, Gandhinagar

In GermanDas Fallen des Banyanbaums, translated by Lothar Lutze, Botschaft der Bundesrepublik Deutschland, New Delhi, 1980Bombay/Mumbai: Bilder einer Mega-Stadt (with Henning Stegmuller and Namdeo Dhasal) translated by Lothar Lutze, A-1 Verlag, MunchenWorte des Tukaram, Translated by Lothar Lutze, A=1 Verlag, Munchen
Lotos Blatter 1: Dilip Chitre: Aus dem Englischen und dem Marathi, translated by Lothar Lutze, Proben Indische Poesie: Lotos Verlag Roland Beer; Berlin, 2001

Paintings and exhibitions
1969, First One Man Show of Oil Paintings; Bombay; India;
1975, Triple Triptych; in collaboration with Peter Clarke and Ahmed Muhammad Imamovic; Iowa City, Iowa; USA;
Participation in group shows in India and the Netherlands;
Dilip Chitre 63: Mini-Retrospective of Paintings in Pune (1986–2001); Studio S, Pune;2001;
In the collection of Air-India International, Bombay, India;

Filmography and videographyVijeta, produced by Filmvalas, Mumbai, directed by Govind Nihalani; story and screenplayGodam, produced by the National Film Development Corporation, Mumbai; screenplay, direction, and musicArdha Satya, directed by Govind Nihalani; theme poemA Tryst With Destiny, produced by S.S. Oberoi; script and directionEducation '72, produced by S.S. Oberoi; script and directionA Question of Identity, produced by Y.R.Khandekar; script, direction, and narrationDattu, produced by Dnyada Naik; script and directionMade in India, producer, scriptwriter, and director, on behalf of the Industrial Design Centre, Indian Institute of Technology, Powai, MumbaoBombay:Geliebte Moloch, produced by Adanos-Film, gmbh, Munich, Germany; Co-Scriptwriter and C-Director; Videofilms Made For The Archives of Bharat Bhavan, Bhopal (1984–85)Shakti Chattopadhyaya: Portrait of the Poet, produced by Bharat Bhavan, Bhopal; Concept, Script, and DirectionTranslating Shakti Chattopadhyaya into English: a discussion with Jyotirmoy Datta and Arvind Krishna Meherotra, concept and direction, produced by Bharat Bhavan, BhopalTranslating Shakti Chattopadhyaya into Hindi a discussion with Kedar Nath Singh and Prayag Shukla, concept and directionShamsher Bahadur Singh: A Portrait of the Poet, concept and directionShamsher Bahadur Singh in discussion with Namvar Singh and Ashok Vajpeyi, Concept and Direction, produced by Bharat Bhavan BhopalK.Satchidanandan: A Portrait of the Poet and a discussion by Sudha Gopalakrishnan and Rajendra Dhodapkar, concept and direction, produced by Bharat Bhavan, BhopalIn The Darkness of the Twentieth Century: A discussion featuring Shrikant, Verma, Namvar Singh, and Ashok Vajpeyi, concept and direction, produced by Bharat Bhavan, BhopalKunwar Narayan: A Portrait of the Poet, Concept and Direction, produced by Bharat Bhavan, BhopalB.C.Sanyal: Memories of Life and Art at 82, concept and direction; for Sahitya Akademi, New DelhiNarayan Surve: A Poet of The Proliterait (in Marathi, Hindi, and English versions), 2000

EditorShabda (1954–1960), MumbaiNew Quest (1978–1980), (2001–), Mumbai

ColumnistThe Free Press Journal, Mumbai (1959–1960)Loksatta, MumbaiDinank, MumbaiRavivar Sakal, PuneQuestNew QuestAbhiruchiOccasional book reviewer/contributor of articlesThe Indian ExpressThe Times of IndiaSakaal TimesQuestNew QuestGranthThe Illustrated Weekly of IndiaTimes WeeklyBiblioGalleryKala-VartaSakshatkarPoorvagraha''

References

External links
Chitre Home Page
Tribute to Chitre at Cerebration.org by Sachin Ketkar
Chitre's Interview at Rediff.com
A very Important Article by Chitre on Marathi Poetry
Dilip Chitre Interview
Articles on various topics written by Chitre. Many of them unpublished

Online Poetry 
At Poetry International Web
At Muse India
at Kavitayan
Childhood
Haikus
Rape of Gujarat
Ode to Bombay
Frescos on Little Mag
Hindi Translations of some poems at Pratilipi
Poems from Shesha
Gujarati translations of some poems by Hemang Desai

1938 births
2009 deaths
Deaths from cancer in India
Print editors
Film directors from Gujarat
Indian documentary filmmakers
Indian male screenwriters
Indian male painters
Marathi-language writers
Marathi-language poets
English-language poets from India
Recipients of the Sahitya Akademi Award in Marathi
Indian film critics
20th-century Indian painters
20th-century Indian poets
20th-century Indian translators
International Writing Program alumni
20th-century Indian film directors
People from Vadodara
20th-century Indian male writers
Recipients of the Gangadhar National Award
20th-century Indian screenwriters
Recipients of the Sahitya Akademi Prize for Translation
20th-century Indian male artists